— closing lines of Rudyard Kipling's If—, first published this year in Rewards and Fairies

Nationality words link to articles with information on the nation's poetry or literature (for instance, Irish or French).

Events
 Oxford Poetry founded as a literary magazine by publisher Basil Blackwell in England.

Works published

Canada
 The Rev. James B. Dollard, also known as "Father Dollard", Poems
 Frederick George Scott, also known as "F. G. Scott", Collected Poems
 Tom MacInnes, In Amber Lands, mostly a reprint of Lonesome Bar and Other Poems 1909
 "Yukon Bill" [Kate Simpson Hayes], Derby Days in the Yukon.

United Kingdom
 Hilaire Belloc, Verses
 Frances Cornford, Poems
 W. H. Davies, Farewell to Posey, and Other Pieces
 James Elroy Flecker, Thirty-Six Poems
 Ford Madox Ford, Songs from London
 Wilfrid Gibson, Daily Bread
 Laurence Hope, editor, Indian Love Lyrics, London: Heinemann; anthology; Indian poetry in English, published in the United Kingdom
 Rudyard Kipling, Rewards and Fairies, short stories and poems, including If—
 Thomas MacDonagh, Songs of Myself, Irish poet published in Ireland
 John Masefield, Ballads and Poems
 Lady Margaret Sackville, editor, A Book of Verse by Living Women
 W. B. Yeats, Irish poet published in the United Kingdom:
 The Green Helmet and other Poems
 Poems: Second Series

United States
Baseball's Sad Lexiconby Franklin Pierce Adams
These are the saddest of possible words:
"Tinker to Evers to Chance."
Trio of bear cubs, and fleeter than birds,
Tinker and Evers and Chance.
Ruthlessly pricking our gonfalon bubble,
Making a Giant hit into a double –
Words that are heavy with nothing but trouble:
"Tinker to Evers to Chance."  
 Charles Follen Adams, Yawcob Strauss and Other Poems
 Franklin Pierce Adams, Baseball's Sad Lexicon, also known as "Tinker to Evers to Chance" after its refrain; a popular baseball poem
 Robert Underwood Johnson, Saint-Gaudens, an Ode
 John A. Lomax, Cowboy Songs and Other Frontier Ballads
 Ezra Pound:
 Provenca
 The Spirit of Romance
 Edward Arlington Robinson, The Town Down the River, Charles Scrabbler's Sons
 George Santayana, Three Philosophical Poets: Lucretius, Dante, and Goethe, criticism

Other in English
 Joseph Furtado, Lays of Old Goa, Indian poetry in English
 Laurence Hope, editor, Indian Love Lyrics, London: Heinemann; anthology; Indian poetry in English, published in the United Kingdom
 Henry Lawson, The Skyline Riders and other Verses, Australia
 W.B. Yeats, Irish poet published in the United Kingdom:
 The Green Helmet and other Poems
 Poems: Second Series

Works published in other languages

France
 Paul Claudel, Cinq Grandes Odes, France
 Jean Cocteau, Le prince frivole
 Alphonse Métérié, Carnets
 Charles Péguy, Mystère de la charité de Jeanne d'Arc
 Saint-John Perse, Elèges

Other languages
 Delmira Agustini, Cantos de la mañana, Uruguay
 Ernst Enno, Estonia
 Gurajada Appa Rao, Mutyala Saralu, Indian poetry, Telugu-language (surname: Gurajada)
 Takuboku Ishikawa, Ichiakuno suna ("A Handful of Sand"), Japanese (surname: Ishikawa)
 Maria Konopnicka, Pan Balcer w Brazylii, Polish
 Peider Lansel, editor, La musa ladina, anthology of Romansh language Swiss poets
 Rabindranath Tagore, Gitanjali, Bengali

Awards and honors
 Newdigate Prize (University of Oxford) – Charles Bewley, "Atlantis"
 Chancellor's Prize for Latin Verse Composition (University of Oxford) – Ronald Knox

Births
 January 11 – Nikos Kavadias (died 1975), Greek
 March 21 – Elizabeth Riddell (died 1998), Australian
 August 14 – Nathan Alterman (died 1970), Israeli poet, journalist and translator
 August 30 – Màrius Torres (died 1942), Catalan Spanish poet
 October 30 – Miguel Hernández (died 1942), Spanish poet
 November 10 – Máirtín Ó Direáin (died 1988), Irish poet writing in the Irish language
 November 14 – Norman MacCaig (died 1996) Scottish poet
 November 20 – Pauli Murray (Anna Pauline (Pauli) Murray; died 1985), African American civil-rights advocate, feminist, lawyer, writer, poet, teacher and ordained Episcopal priest
 November 21? – Frank Eyre (died 1988), English-born Australian publisher
 December 19 – Jean Genet (died 1986), French novelist, playwright and poet
 December 27 – Charles Olson (died 1970), American poet
 December 30 – Paul Bowles (died 1999), American poet, author, composer and translator
 Also – R. D. Murphy, Australian poet

Deaths

 January 18 – James Cuthbertson (born 1851), Australian
 January 29 – Arthur Munby (born 1828), English diarist, poet and lawyer
 April 19 – Anna Laetitia Waring (born 1823), Welsh-born poet and hymnodist
 October 17:
William Vaughn Moody (born 1869), American dramatist and poet
 Julia Ward Howe, 91, American poet best known as the author of "Battle Hymn of the Republic"
 November 13 – Isabel Richey (born 1858), American
 December 30 – Thomas Edward Spencer (born 1845), Australian
 Also:
 Augusta Bristol (born 1835), American
 Gilbert Brooke, Singapore

See also

 Poetry
 List of years in poetry
 Silver Age of Russian Poetry
 Acmeist poetry movement in Russian poetry
 Ego-Futurism movement in Russian poetry
 Expressionism movement in German poetry
 Young Poland (Polish: Młoda Polska) modernist period in Polish arts and literature

Notes

Poetry
20th-century poetry